Flo is a name.  It may refer to:

Given name or nickname 
 Flo Ankah, French actress, singer, and filmmaker
 Flo Bojaj (born 1996), Kosovo Albanian footballer
 Flo Cluff (1902–1990), Australian trade unionist
 Florentino Fernández (actor) (born 1972), known as Flo, Spanish actor and comedian
 Flo Gennaro (born 1991), Argentine fashion model
 Flo Hyman (1954–1986), American volleyball player
 Flo McGarrell (1974–2010), American artist
 Flo Morrissey (born 1994), English singer-songwriter
 Flo Mounier (born 1974), Canadian drummer
 Frederick Law Olmsted (1822–1903), or FLO, American journalist and landscape designer
 Flo Perkins (born 1951), American glass artist
 Flo Rida (born 1979), American rapper
 Flo Sandon's (1924–2006), Italian singer
 Flo Thamba (born 1999), Congolese basketball player
 Flo V. Schwarz, German musician
 Flo Milli (born 2000), American rapper 
 Flo Steinberg (1939–2017), American comic book publisher
 Flo Whyard (1917–2012), Canadian politician
 Flo Ziegfeld (1867–1932), American theatre impresario
 Mark Volman (born 1947), pseudonym Flo, American musician

Surname 
 Asbjørn Blokkum Flø (born 1973), Norwegian composer
 Håvard Flo (born 1970), Norwegian footballer
 Helge Flo (born 1966), Norwegian Paralympic cross-country skier
 Jarle Flo (born 1970), Norwegian footballer
 Jostein Flo (born 1964), Norwegian footballer
 Per-Egil Flo (born 1989), Norwegian footballer
 Rasmus Flo (1851–1905), Norwegian proponent of the use of Nynorsk
 Tore André Flo (born 1973), Norwegian footballer
 Ulrik Flo (born 1988), Norwegian footballer
 Adolphe Le Flô (1804–1887), French Army general and politician